Cosmochlaina (from Greek: kosmos=ornament; xlaina=wrapper/cloak) is a form genus of nematophyte – an early (Silurian – Devonian) plant known only from fossil cuticles, often found in association with tubular structures. 
The form genus was put forwards by Dianne Edwards, and is diagnosed by inwards-pointing flanges and randomly oriented pseudo-cellular units. Projections on the outer surface are always present, and sometimes also appear on the inner surface; however, the surface of the cuticle itself is always smooth.  The holes in the cuticle are often covered by round flaps, loosely attached along a side.

Where Nematothallus was sometimes used to relate only to tube-like structures, Cosmochlaina was used in reference to the cuticle fragments.  Material discovered later revealed its internal anatomy, which comprises a lichen-like mat of 'hyphae'.

It has been suggested that the pores of Cosmochlaina represent broken-off rhizoids, on the basis that rotting and acid treatment of extant liverworts produces a similar perforated texture.  However, the status of this form genus in any one kingdom is not secure; members could, for example, represent arthropod cuticle.  Alternatively, different species may in fact represent different parts of the same organism.  Based on the more recent material, a lichen affinity seems most plausible.

See also
Nematothallus, a closely related sister taxon
Evolutionary history of plants

References

Silurian plants
Devonian plants